Café Americain is an American television sitcom starring Valerie Bertinelli that aired on NBC from September 18, 1993, to February 8, 1994, with two leftover episodes shown on May 28, 1994. It was filmed at Warner Bros. Studios in Burbank, California.

Overview
Bertinelli played a young American woman, Holly Aldrige, who finds a job working as a waitress in a small café in France. The cast consisted of an assortment of eccentric characters from around the world who regularly visited the café, interacting in many hilarious circumstances. Madame Ybarra, a former dictator's wife, was a thinly veiled spoof of Imelda Marcos. Fabiana Borelli, the tempestuous Italian model, and her perpetually jealous Italian lover Carlo, regularly sparred and reconciled, with Carlo declaring of any real or imagined rival, "I kill him! I kill him bad! I kill him two times!" Marcel's on and off relationship with Holly set the stage for comedic interference by several guest star suitors.

Cast
Valerie Bertinelli as Holly Aldrige
Lila Kaye as Margaret Hunt
Sofia Milos as Fabiana Borelli
Maurice Godin as Marcel
Jodi Long as Madama Ybarra
Graham Beckel as Steve Sullivan

Production and casting
Although Lila Kaye played the role of Margaret in the series pilot, the role was re-cast with Happy Days actress Marion Ross when the series was picked up. Within a month, Ross was gone and Kaye agreed to reprise the role. The role of Margaret Hunt was also offered to Rue McClanahan, but she turned it down.

At the time of filming, Valerie Bertinelli was married to guitarist Eddie Van Halen, who appeared in the 7th episode, "Home Alone," as a street musician that Bertinelli's character Holly Aldridge chases out of the cafe. Van Halen spoke one line, "Praat je tegen mij?" The line is Dutch for "Are you talking to me?"

Episodes

References

External links

1990s American sitcoms
1993 American television series debuts
1994 American television series endings
English-language television shows
NBC original programming
Television series by Warner Bros. Television Studios
Television shows set in Paris